Sarah Louise Clouston Geeson (born 23 June 1950), known professionally as Sally Geeson is an English actress with a career mostly on television in the 1970s. She is best known for playing Sid James's daughter, Sally, in Bless This House and for her roles in Carry On Abroad (1972) and Carry On Girls (1973). She also starred alongside Norman Wisdom in the film What's Good for the Goose (1969), and appeared with Vincent Price in two horror films, The Oblong Box (1969) and Cry of the Banshee (1970).

Early life
Geeson's father was an editor for the National Coal Board magazine while her mother worked in the box office at the London Coliseum cinema.

Career
Geeson studied at Corona Stage Academy from 1957 to 1966, during which time she played small non-speaking roles in several movies, including Expresso Bongo (1959), The Millionairess (1960), Spare the Rod (1961), The Young Ones and Carry On Regardless (1961). She played a schoolgirl in The Great St Trinian's Train Robbery (1966), and appeared as a girl guide in Don't Raise the Bridge, Lower the River (1968). She starred alongside Norman Wisdom in the comedy film What's Good for the Goose (1969) and Vincent Price in the horror films The Oblong Box (1969) and Cry of the Banshee (1970).

In 1971, Geeson appeared in Mr. Forbush and the Penguins before starring as Sally in Bless This House, appearing in all 65 episodes until the show's end in 1976 as well as starring in a film spin-off of the same name in 1972. She also appeared in two further Carry On films: Carry On Abroad (1972) and Carry On Girls (1973).

In August 2013 Geeson featured in a TV commercial for Anglian Windows. In December 2014 until January 2015, Geeson played the Good Fairy at Theatre Royal Windsor in their panto Beauty And The Beast.

Personal life
Geeson married television personality William G. Stewart in 1976 and the pair had two children together. The couple divorced ten years later in 1986. She later took up a career in teaching and married Richard Lewis, an estate agent and had a further child. Her sister is the actress Judy Geeson.

Filmography
 Expresso Bongo (1959) — Extra (uncredited)
 The Millionairess (1960) — Extra (uncredited)
 Carry On Regardless (1961) – Girl at Toy Exhibition (uncredited)
 Spare the Rod (1961) — Extra (uncredited)
 The Young Ones — Extra (uncredited)
 Go To Blazes (1962 film) - Girl playing on fire engine (uncredited}
 The Great St Trinian's Train Robbery (1966) – Schoolgirl (uncredited)
 Mrs. Brown, You've Got a Lovely Daughter (1968) — Extra (uncredited)
 Don't Raise the Bridge, Lower the River (1968) – Girl Guide (uncredited)
 What's Good for the Goose (1969) – Nikki
 The Oblong Box (1969) – Sally
 Cry of the Banshee (1970) – Sarah
 Mr. Forbush and the Penguins (1971) – Jackie
 Bless This House (1972) – Sally Abbot
 Carry On Abroad (1972) – Lily
 Carry On Girls (1973) – Debra

Television
 Armchair Mystery Theatre (1964) – Jill
 Boy Meets Girl (1967) – Debutante 
 Man in a Suitcase – Day of Execution (1967) – Girl at Cleaners
 Sanctuary – The Girl with the Blue Guitar (1968) – Tina
 You and the World (1968) – Eileen
 ITV Playhouse – Camille (1968) – Kim
 Galton and Simpson Comedy (1969)
 Detective – Hunt the Peacock (1969) – Patsy
 Strange Report – Whose Pretty Girl Are You (1969) – Jennifer Dean
 Softly, Softly: Taskforce (1970) – Sue
 Z-Cars – A Day Like Every Day (1970) – Sharon Young
 Wicked Women – Florence Maybrick (1970) – Alice Yapp
 Bless This House (1971–1976) – Sally Abbott (Last appearances)
 The Fenn Street Gang – Smart Lad Wanted (1972) – Melanie
 My Name Is Harry Worth – The Family Reunion (1974) – Sandra

Selected theatre workGoodnight Mrs PuffinThe Day After The FairButterflies Are Free (Bill Kenwright Productions)Blood And Roses'' (Bill Kenwright Productions)

References

External links

Sally Geeson's official web site
Brainy History Page

1950 births
Living people
English film actresses
English television actresses
English child actresses
People from Cuckfield
20th-century English actresses
British comedy actresses
Actresses from Sussex